The men's doubles was one of four events of the tennis program at the 2009 Games of the Small States of Europe in Cyprus.

Medalists

Seeds
 Domenico Vicini / Stefano Galvani (final, silver medalists)
 Photos Kallias / Demetrios Leontis (first round)
 Jean-René Lisnard / Guillaume Couillard (champions, gold medalists)
 Arnar Sigurdsson / Birkir Gunnarsson (semifinals, bronze medalists)

Draw

References
 Men's Doubles Draw

Men's doubles